Robert W. Pierce was a member of the Wisconsin State Assembly.

Biography
Pierce was born on February 14, 1821, in Buckland, Massachusetts. He died in 1914.

Career
Pierce was a member of the Assembly during the 1883 and 1885 sessions. He was a Republican.

References

People from Buckland, Massachusetts
Politicians from Milwaukee
Republican Party members of the Wisconsin State Assembly
1821 births
1914 deaths
19th-century American politicians